Qater Yuran-e Olya (also Romanized as Qāţer Yūrān-e ‘Olyā; also known as Yadī Qārdāsh (Persian: يدي قارداش), Qāţer Yūrān-e Bālā, and Sālār Qeshlaqī) is a village in Ojarud-e Shomali Rural District, in the Central District of Germi County, Ardabil Province, Iran. At the 2006 census, its population was 53, in 9 families.

References 

Towns and villages in Germi County